Normal, Ohio is an American television sitcom aired on Fox in 2000. The show stars John Goodman as William "Butch" Gamble, a gay man returning to his Midwestern home town. The cast also includes Joely Fisher, Anita Gillette, Orson Bean, Mo Gaffney and Charles Rocket. The title is a reference to Sherwood Anderson's Winesburg, Ohio.

Overview
The original concept for the series was an Odd Couple–style situation comedy called Don't Ask, with Goodman as "Rex", sharing his West Hollywood apartment with college friend David (Anthony LaPaglia). Although the pilot was well-received, creators Bonnie and Terry Turner felt that the premise was not strong enough for an ongoing series. LaPaglia's character was written out and the series was relocated to Ohio.

The show was most notable for the divisions it exposed regarding American culture's view of homosexuality. Gamble is an average blue collar bear-type gay man, with many traits typical of American masculinity, including a love of football and beer, and very few of the traits stereotypically associated with gay men. Nevertheless, his sexuality itself was signified in part by isolated moments of more stereotypically gay behavior, such as singing snippets of Broadway show tunes and helping his sister to color her hair, that were seemingly at odds with the way his character was presented most of the time. As a result, some media outlets dismissed Goodman's role as unrealistic.

Goodman won the People's Choice Award for Best Actor in a New Comedy Series, but, up against the second half hour of Who Wants to Be a Millionaire?, it flopped in the Nielsen ratings. Twelve episodes of the series were made, but only seven were aired before its cancellation.

Goodman appeared on the cover of TV Guide's 2000 Fall Preview issue, along with three other actors starring in new sitcoms: Geena Davis, Bette Midler and Michael Richards. The magazine proclaimed them a "fab foursome", but none of the shows was a hit. (In the 2001 Fall Preview issue, the 2000 cover was re-printed with thought balloons over the actors' heads, with Goodman's saying, "Even I didn't buy me as a gay dad!")

Cast
John Goodman as William "Butch" Gamble
Anita Gillette as Joan Gamble
Joely Fisher as Pamela Gamble-Miller
Greg Pitts as Charlie Gamble
Julia McIlvaine as Kimberly Miller
Cody Kasch as Robbie Miller 
Orson Bean as Bill Gamble
Mo Gaffney as Elizabeth
Charles Rocket as Danny

Episodes

References

External links
 Normal, Ohio @ Carsey-Werner
 Carsey-Werner - Normal Ohio
 
 

2000 American television series debuts
2000 American television series endings
2000s American sitcoms
2000s American LGBT-related comedy television series
2000s American LGBT-related television series
English-language television shows
Fox Broadcasting Company original programming
Gay-related television shows
Television series by Carsey-Werner Productions
Television shows set in Ohio
Bear (gay culture)
Television series created by Bonnie and Terry Turner
American LGBT-related sitcoms
2000s LGBT-related sitcoms